The South African cricket team toured India in September and October 2022 to play three One Day International (ODI) and three Twenty20 International (T20I) matches as a preparatory series before 2022 ICC Men's T20 World Cup. In August 2022, the Board of Control for Cricket in India (BCCI) confirmed the schedule for the tour. The ODI series formed part of the inaugural 2020–2023 ICC Cricket World Cup Super League.

Squads

South Africa also named Bjorn Fortuin, Marco Jansen and Andile Phehlukwayo as standby players for the T20I squad. Deepak Hooda and Mohammed Shami were ruled out of India's T20I squad and were replaced by Shreyas Iyer and Umesh Yadav respectively. Shahbaz Ahmed also was added to India's T20I squad. On 30 September, Mohammed Siraj was added as a replacement for Jasprit Bumrah, who was ruled of the T20I series due to a back injury. South Africa's Dwaine Pretorius was ruled out of the ODI squad after sustaining a fractured thumb during the third T20I, with Marco Jansen being named as his replacement. Before the second ODI, Deepak Chahar was ruled out of the ODI series due to a stiffness in his back and was replaced by Washington Sundar.

T20I series

1st T20I

2nd T20I

3rd T20I

ODI series

1st ODI

2nd ODI

3rd ODI

Notes

References

External links
 Series home at ESPNcricinfo

2022 in Indian cricket
2022 in South African cricket
International cricket competitions in 2022–23
South African cricket tours of India